Political security is one of five sectors of analysis under the framework of the Copenhagen School of security studies.

Within policy circles political security is part of a human security agenda. The 1994 Human Development Report (HDR) set out the definition and parameters of political security. Produced by Mahbub ul Haq, a Pakistani, in fewer than 400 words. It was defined as the prevention of government repression, systematic violation of human rights and threats from militarization. This established an agenda that would protect people against states that continued to practice political repression, systematic torture, ill treatment and disappearance

References

 Copenhagen School (security studies)
 Security studies